Pablo Frescobar is the debut independent album by Canadian rapper Raz Fresco. The album was released on July 1, 2015, by Black Light Music, Duck Down Music Inc. and Bakers Club Records. The album features guest appearances by Bakers Club members The 6th Letter, and Lo Thraxx, along with Raekwon, Chuck Inglish, Bishop Nehru, and Tre Mission. It was supported by the singles "Warning Shots / Murda", "Influenza Featuring Raekwon", "Equinox Featuring Bishop Nehru", "Screwface City", "Cortez Nikes Featuring Chuck Inglish" and "Up North".

Reception
The album received a positive review from Canadian music magazine Exclaim!, giving it a score of 8/10 and calling it "consistently bold and thought provoking."

References

2015 debut albums
Duck Down Music albums